Ashley is one of thirty-five council wards in the city of Bristol in the United Kingdom. The ward contains the areas of Baptist Mills, Montpelier, St Andrew's, St Paul's and St Werburgh's. The Ward has over 16,000 residents and is served by one community magazine and resident-led organisational body called 'Vocalise'.

Politics

Ashley is part of the Bristol West parliamentary constituency, which elects one Member of Parliament. The incumbent MP is Thangam Debbonaire of the Labour Party.

Ashley sends three councillors to Bristol City Council. Currently, these are Amirah Cole (Labour), Jude English (Green) and Tim Wye (Green).

Baptist Mills

Baptist Mills is a small area of Bristol, located between St Werburghs and Easton. It was home to a brass works between 1700 and 1840, and a pottery between 1840 and 1891. The area is now often regarded as part of St Werburghs. In the 19th century, part of Baptist Mills was also known as Botany Bay and regarded as a fairly lawless area.

Montpelier

Montpelier is an area of North Bristol. It is bounded by Cheltenham Road to the west, St Paul's to the south, St Werburgh's to the east and St Andrew's to the north. It has its own railway station, and a reputation as bohemian. Picton Street is a haven for lovers of organic and vegetarian cuisine.

Previously, Montpelier was carved by French prisoners of war (POWs) from the Napoleonic conflicts. Almost all streets are named after famous generals or have military connotations, such as Wellington, York and Banner Roads. Stories are told of the POWs transporting spoil from the New Cut to lay the foundations for the terrace housing. Original cobble stones laid by the POW's can be seen in the gutters and some secluded alleys.

Picton Street was built and named in honour of Sir Thomas Picton who, as Captain Picton, in 1783 endeared himself to Bristolians by bravely facing the rebellious 75th Regiment on College Green and averting a military mutiny. There is a double-bayed villa in the street named after him, Picton Lodge.

St Andrew's
St Andrew's is a suburb of Bristol situated about 3 km (1.8 miles) north of the city centre. The area was developed in the late 19th century as St Andrew's Park Estate, and consists mostly of large Victorian villas, with some inter-war housing and some minor rebuilding in Cromwell Road and Belvoir Road following enemy action in World War II.

The area is roughly bounded by the Severn Beach Railway Line, Gloucester Road, Somerville Road and Cromwell Road; however the boundary is debatable: according to the Ordnance Survey map this area is Montpelier, whereas according to the National Gazetteer of 1868, Montpelier is a hamlet within the Parish of St Andrew's. St Andrew's Church, which gave the area its name, was in St Andrew's Road, Montpelier. The church was demolished in 1969.

The David Thomas Memorial church was erected 1879–1881 and demolished in 1987, destroying most of a Gothic fantasy by Stuart Colman. The building still retains a thin octagonal spire and west front but the massive halls, apse and rib vaults have now gone in favour of flats by Stride Treglown.

In the mid 20th century, the area became unfashionable and many of the houses were converted to multiple occupation. However, during the 1990s, the area became fashionable again and consequently many houses are now being converted back into family homes.

St Andrew's is well served by public transport, with frequent buses to all parts of the city from Gloucester Road, buses to University of West England's Frenchay Campus and a local train service from Montpelier to Bristol Temple Meads, Clifton and Avonmouth on the Severn Beach Line.

St Andrew's Park
St Andrew's Park is at the heart of the area. The park was laid out in 1895, and is home to events such as 'Music in the Park' during the summer, and 'Carols in the Park' at Christmas. The park features a well-sized children's play area, permanent paddling pool (serviced and used only in the summer months) and public toilets (limited opening hours). Despite being located on a hilly incline, the park is well used for football and frisbee throughout the year. On 30 April 1941 a Wellington bomber on a night training flight crashed in the park after hitting barrage balloon cables. There is now a memorial to the crash in the park. A website has been created about the crash.

St Paul's

St Paul's is an inner suburb of Bristol, England, situated just north east of the city centre and west of the M32. In the early 18th century it was laid out as one of Bristol's first suburbs. St Paul's ranks highly on national indices of multiple deprivation.

St Werburgh's

St. Werburgh's is an area in central north-east Bristol, England. Surrounded by the M32 motorway, railway embankments and allotment slopes it has the feel of a green village in the inner city.
The area became known as St.Werburgh's when St Werburgh's Church was relocated (and substantially rebuilt) to Mina Road in this district from Corn Street, Bristol in 1879. It is now a Climbing Centre run by Undercover Rock.

References

External links

 Montpelier Website
 Montpelier Village's Website
 Friends of St Andrews Park Website
 Map of Ashley Polling Districts on the Bristol Council website
 Vocalise website

Areas of Bristol
Wards of Bristol